The Clever Fox (German: Der krasse Fuchs) is a 1926 German silent comedy film directed by Conrad Wiene and starring Hans Brausewetter, Clementine Plessner and Werner Pittschau. The film premiered in Berlin on 4 March 1926. It is based on the 1906 novel of the same title by Walter Bloem.

Cast
 Hans Brausewetter as Werner Achenbach 
 Clementine Plessner as Witwe Marks 
 Werner Pittschau as Willy Klauser 
 Harry Hardt as Scholz - Erstchargierter des Corps 
 Hanni Reinwald as Lenchen Trimp 
 Robert Leffler as Professor Hollerbaum 
 Elza Temary as Rose Marks - die Witwes Tochter 
 Karl Victor Plagge as Corpsdiener 
 Martin Wolfgang as Franz 
 Valerie Boothby as Marie 
 Angelo Ferrari   
 Ludwig Rex

References

Bibliography
 Grange, William. Cultural Chronicle of the Weimar Republic. Scarecrow Press, 2008.

External links

1926 films
Films of the Weimar Republic
German silent feature films
German comedy films
Films directed by Conrad Wiene
1926 comedy films
German black-and-white films
Silent comedy films
Films based on German novels
1920s German films
1920s German-language films